The list of shipwrecks in October 1869 includes ships sunk, foundered, grounded, or otherwise lost during October 1869.

1 October

2 October

3 October

4 October

5 October

References

Bibliography
Ingram, C. W. N., and Wheatley, P. O., (1936) Shipwrecks: New Zealand disasters 1795–1936. Dunedin, NZ: Dunedin Book Publishing Association.

1869-10
Maritime incidents in October 1869